Éric Aumonier may refer to:

 Eric Aumonier (1899–1974), British sculptor
 Éric Aumonier (bishop) (born 1946), French bishop